Grendi  is a village in Bygland municipality in Agder county, Norway. The village is located on the east side of the lake Byglandsfjorden in the south part of the municipality. In the early 1900s, a tuberculosis sanatorium was established in Grendi.

References

Villages in Agder
Bygland